Nieuw Land National Park (New Land National Park; Dutch: Nationaal Park Nieuw Land) is a national park in the Dutch province of Flevoland.

It was established on October 1, 2018, when Minister Carola Schouten visited the province to make the announcement. The national park is managed by the organizations Flevo-landschap, Staatsbosbeheer, and Natuurmonumenten. The land, mostly wetlands, is part of the artificial island Flevopolder. Nature reserves that are part of the national park include the Oostvaardersplassen, the Lepelaarplassen, the lake Markermeer, and the artificial archipelago Marker Wadden. Some of those areas were already protected Natura 2000 sites before the park's creation. Nieuw Land National Park is visited by numerous species of migratory birds.

In 2019, governments and nature organizations committed to spending €470 million in the next twenty years to develop the park and to connect its separate parts.

References

External links 
 Official website 

Protected areas established in 2018
2018 establishments in the Netherlands
National parks of the Netherlands
Geography of Flevoland
Tourist attractions in Flevoland
Almere
Lelystad